Time smearing or time-average smearing is the degradation of the reconstructed image of a celestial body observed by a ground-based interferometer that occurs because of the duration of the observation. Unlike single telescopes or cameras that can compensate the Earth's rotation in real time with a dedicated mount, the different telescopes of the interferometer are at fixed positions on the Earth. As a result, maps obtained with interferometers feature the elongated orthoradial features similar to those of night sky photographs taken with a fixed tripod, unless they use short enough integration times.

The smearing is a problem for long integration times or very separated telescopes. Mostly an issue in radioastronomy, it severely limits the usable field of view of observations in very long baseline interferometry.

See also
 Radio astronomy#Radio interferometry
 Radio telescope#Radio interferometry

References
 Bridle, Alan H. and Schwab, Frederic R., Wide Field Imaging I: Bandwidth and Time-Average Smearing in Synthesis imaging in radio astronomy (1989), eds. Richard A. Perley, Frederic R. Schwab, Astronomical Society of the Pacific Conference Series, vol. 6, p. 247.

Interferometry